The 2si 230 is a family of single-cylinder, two-stroke, single ignition, aircraft engines that were designed for ultralight aircraft.

The basic engine was originally designed and produced by JLO-Motorenwerke of Germany and was later acquired by the AMW Cuyuna Engine Company of Beaufort, South Carolina and marketed under the Cuyuna brand name. Later the engine was marketed by Cuyuna under the Two Stroke International (2si) brand. Cuyuna no longer markets engines for aircraft use although the 230 is still in production as a diesel/multifuel or gasoline industrial and marine engine.

Development
The 230 is a conventional single-cylinder engine that weighs only  in its A20 version. The engine features single capacitor discharge ignition, piston porting, tuned exhaust system, slide venturi-type carburetor, fuel pump, a cast iron cylinder liner, ball, needle and roller bearings throughout. The engine was offered with cog belt drive or a gearbox reduction system. Starting is electric starter or recoil starter.

Variants
230-A20
Gasoline aircraft engine,  at 6000 rpm, weight , out of production.
230F-20
Gasoline industrial engine,  at 6000 rpm, weight  without gearbox, still in production.
230-F22
Gasoline aircraft engine,  at 6500 rpm, weight , out of production.
230 MF
Diesel/multifuel industrial and marine engine,  at 5700 rpm, still in production.

Specifications (230-A20)

See also

References

Air-cooled aircraft piston engines
Two-stroke aircraft piston engines